Standard Telecommunication Laboratories was the UK research centre for Standard Telephones and Cables (STC).
Initially based in Enfield, North London, and moved to Harlow Essex in 1959. STC was a subsidiary of ITT.

Notable Achievements
It is now recognised as the birthplace of optical fibre communications, for it is here that Sir Charles K. Kao, George Hockham and others pioneered the use of single-mode optical fibre made from low loss glass. In 2009 Charles Kao was awarded the 2009 Nobel Prize in Physics, for pioneering optical fibre communication.

Another famous name associated with STL is Alec Reeves, previously famous for inventing pulse-code modulation while working at the Paris labs of the parent company ITT in 1938, and for his invention of the wartime bomber navigation system OBOE. Alec headed a team working on various means of optical communication, prior to the emergence of glass optical fibre as the leading contender.

Ownership
In 1991, the laboratories became a part of Bell Northern Research (BNR), following the acquisition of STC by Northern Telecom, which later became Nortel.

Nortel subsequently encountered financial difficulties, and was broken up and sold off. The last remnants of the laboratories at the Harlow, Essex site, have now disappeared.

Redevelopment Of Laboratories Site
Since the collapse of Nortel, the site has been redeveloped into a new high-technology business development called KAOPARK.

References

External links
A Brief History of STL - By Vi Maile

Buildings and structures in the London Borough of Enfield
Buildings and structures in Essex
Fiber-optic communications
Harlow
History of telecommunications in the United Kingdom
ITT Inc.
Research and development organizations
Research institutes in England
Science and technology in Essex
Telecommunications organizations